The Cathedral Church of Saint John the Baptist and Saint Patrick's Rock is a cathedral of the Church of Ireland in Cashel, County Tipperary in Ireland. It is in the ecclesiastical province of Dublin.

Previously the cathedral of the Diocese of Cashel, it is now one of six cathedrals in the  United Dioceses of Cashel Ferns and Ossory.

Ecclesiastical history

The historic cathedral on the Rock of Cashel had been seized by the English Crown from the Catholic Church in the 1530s and was then handed over to the newly established Church of Ireland. This mediaeval cathedral was closed for worship by the Church of Ireland in 1721. Meanwhile, the old parish church of St John was removed and the present Georgian cathedral completed in 1784. Its famous Samuel Green organ was built in 1786, while Charles Agar was Archbishop, and the Chapter House was built to hold the Bolton Library.

See also
 Dean of Cashel
 Thurles Cathedral for the cathedral of the Roman Catholic Archdiocese of Casel and Emly

References

Anglican cathedrals in the Republic of Ireland
Diocese of Cashel and Ossory
Cashel, County Tipperary
Religious buildings and structures in County Tipperary